Dr. John H. Stumberg House is a historic home located at St. Charles, St. Charles County, Missouri, United States. It was built in 1869–1870, and is a two-story, "T"-plan, red brick dwelling on a stone foundation. It has a cross-gable roof with dormers and decorated cornice.

It was added to the National Register of Historic Places in 1978.

References

Houses on the National Register of Historic Places in Missouri
Houses completed in 1870
Buildings and structures in St. Charles County, Missouri
National Register of Historic Places in St. Charles County, Missouri